The Aceh People's Party, (PRA) is a regional political party in Indonesia. It is a left-leaning party that opposes discrimination against women and has criticised the implementation of Islamic law in Aceh.

The party contested the 2009 elections in the province of Aceh, and set a target of 12 seats (25%) in the Aceh provincial legislature. However, it won only 36,574 votes, 1.7% of the Aceh turnout, and failed to win any seats. The party did not qualify to contest the 2014 elections.

References

Political parties in Indonesia
Feminism in Indonesia
Socialist parties in Indonesia